Siliguri Municipal Corporation or SMC was established in the year 1994 and has been responsible for the civic infrastructure and administration of the city of Siliguri.

History
Siliguri Municipality was established in the year 1949. The first municipality office was set up in Hill Cart Road. It was
a wooden construction. The first chairman of Siliguri Municipality was the then Sub Divisional Officer (SDO) Sachindra Mohan Guha.
In the year 1994, Siliguri Municipality was awarded Corporation status.

Area Coverage
Siliguri Municipal Corporation areas include both in Darjeeling and Jalpaiguri district. Out of 47 wards of SMC, 14 are in Jalpaiguri district.

Departments

Councillors

References

External links
 

Municipal corporations in West Bengal
1994 establishments in West Bengal
Siliguri